Wild. Club'in is the name of Ruslana's remix album that contains remixes of tracks from her 2004 Wild Dances album, and a couple of other songs as well, such as Wind Song and Drum 'n' Dance.
For the remixes was organised a contest for the best 12 remixes of Ruslana's songs. The winning remixes were included on this album.
It has been released in 2006 in the Czech Republic and Slovakia under the title Tance s vlky. The Czech version is a compilation of the Dyki tantsi, Wild Dances and Club'in albums.

Track listing

Czech/Slovak edition
A special edition of the album has been released in 2006 in the Czech Republic and Slovakia and includes two CDs, the first one with songs from the Dyki tantsi and Wild Dances albums and the second one with the remixes from the basic edition of the Club'in album.

CD 1

CD 2

Charts

External links
Club in
The album on UkrainianMusic.net

References 

Ruslana albums
2005 remix albums